My Dark Symphony is the first EP by the Norwegian power metal/progressive metal band, Conception. It is the first Conception EP with new original material since their last studio album Flow in 1997, and was released on 23 November 2018.

Track listing

Notes
 The EP is included on the second disc of the Japanese release for the band's fifth studio album, State of Deception.

Personnel
All information from the EP booklet.
Band members
 Roy Khan – vocals, orchestration and choir backing on track 5, engineer
 Tore Østby – guitar, keyboards, orchestration, choir backing on track 5, engineer
 Ingar Amlien – bass
 Arve Heimdal – drums

Additional musicians
 Aurora Heimdal – backing vocals on tracks 3 and 6, choir backing on track 5
 Maria Engstrom Østby – talking voice on track 4, choir backing on track 5
 Miro – keyboards, orchestrations (tracks 1–4, 6)

The Family Choir
 Eva Strømhaug Sæverud, Filip Lopes Sousa, Ida Åman, Gun Engvall, Matilda Engström Bergkvist, Melina Fagerström Jusufagic, Natália Lopes, Rafael Tore Lopes Sousa, Sira Gassama, Sixten Engvall Adamo, Vasco Sousa

Production
 Nils Harald Mæhlum – engineer
 Leif Johansen – engineer, choir backing on track 5
 Stefan Glaumann – mixing
 Svante Forsback – mastering
 Seth Siro Anton – artwork
 Gustavo Sazes – layout
 My Olausson – additional graphic design

References

2018 EPs
Conception (band) albums